KFNZ may refer to:

 KJHF, a radio station (103.1 FM) licensed to serve Kualapuu, Hawaii, United States, which held the call sign KFNZ from 2018 to 2019
 KNIT (AM), a radio station (1320 AM) licensed to serve Salt Lake City, Utah, United States, which held the call sign KFNZ from 1996 to 2017